Harkonnen may refer to:

 Baron Vladimir Harkonnen, a fictional villain in the Dune series of novels and films
 Dune: House Harkonnen, the second book in the Prelude to Dune series, written by Brian Herbert and Kevin J. Anderson
 Harkonnen Chair, a series of chair designs by H. R. Giger
 Harkonnen, a weapon used by Seras Victoria in the series Hellsing. The weapons's full name is the Hellsing ARMS Anti-Midian Cannon 'Harkonnen'.

See also
 Harkonen (disambiguation)